Ṣāliḥ ibn ʿAlī ibn ʿAbd Allāh ibn al-ʿAbbās (711–769) was a member of the Banu Abbas who served as general and governor in Syria and Egypt.

Life 
Salih and his brother Abd Allah were among the van of the Abbasid forces which overthrew the Umayyads in 750.  The brothers besieged and took the Caliphate's capital, Damascus, and then pursued the last Umayyad caliph, Marwan II, to Egypt where he was captured and killed.

Salih was named as the first Abbasid governor of Egypt on 9 August 750. He kept the post for less than a year, being named governor of the Jund Filastin (Palestine) in March 751. In this capacity, he sent Sa'id ibn Abdallah in the first raiding expedition  of the Abbasid era against Byzantine Anatolia. On 8 October, 753 he was appointed again as governor of Egypt, a post he held until 21 February 755. At the death of the Caliph al-Saffah, Salih's nephew, in 754, Salih's brother Abd Allah launched a revolt in Syria against the new Caliph al-Mansur, claiming to have been named by the dying Saffah as his successor. Salih refused to join his brother's revolt and even led troops into Syria to help suppress it. He clashed with and defeated Abd Allah's governor of Palestine, al-Hakam ibn Da'ban, while Abd Allah was defeated by Abu Muslim and forced to submit to Mansur.

Despite Abd Allah's rebellion, Salih and his family were established as the paramount Abbasid potentates in Syria, a position they held for the next half-century, as Salih's sons al-Fadl, Ibrahim and Abd al-Malik all held governorships in Syria and Egypt. Salih also appropriated most of the Umayyad dynasty's extensive properties in the area for himself. In addition, he played an important role in the strengthening of the Abbasid-Byzantine frontier, the thughur, re-occupying and rebuilding the former Byzantine cities of Melitene (Malatya), Germanikeia (Mar'ash) and Mopsuestia (al-Massisa). He died in Syria in 769.

See also
 Ishaq ibn Sulayman al-Hashimi

References

Sources 

 

711 births
769 deaths
8th-century Abbasid governors of Egypt
Abbasids
Generals of the Abbasid Caliphate
Abbasid governors of Palestine
Abbasid governors of Egypt
Abbasid people of the Arab–Byzantine wars
Syria under the Abbasid Caliphate
8th-century Arabs
City founders